Paul McLaughlin may refer to:
 Paul McLaughlin (footballer) (born 1965), Scottish former footballer
 Paul McLaughlin (businessman) (born 1969), Scottish businessman
 Paul McLaughlin (actor), New Zealand actor 
Paul McLaughlin (sailor) (1919–2000), Canadian Olympics sailor

See also
 Paul McLachlan (fl. 1980s–2010s), Australian Army officer
 Paul McLoughlin (born 1963), English footballer